WKRO-FM (93.1 MHz) is a commercial radio station licensed to Port Orange, Florida, broadcasting to the Daytona Beach area.  It is owned by Southern Stone Communications and airs a country music radio format branded as "93-1 Coast Country".

WKRO-FM has an effective radiated power (ERP) of 24,500 watts.  The transmitter is off Opportunity Court in Daytona Beach, near South Ridgewood Avenue (U.S. Route 1).

Former formats
Signing on in 1993, the station was originally WEDG, "The Edge."  It changed its call sign to WKRO-FM in 1994, then known as "Crow Radio."

(1993-1995) Oldies
(1995-2000) Modern Rock

References

External links
 Official Website

KRO-FM
Country radio stations in the United States
Radio stations established in 1993
Port Orange, Florida
1993 establishments in Florida